The 2014–15 East Carolina Pirates men's basketball team represented East Carolina University during the 2014–15 NCAA Division I men's basketball season. The Pirates, led by fifth year head coach Jeff Lebo, played their home games at Williams Arena at Minges Coliseum and were first year members of the American Athletic Conference. They finished the season 14–19, 6–12 in AAC play to finish in a tie for seventh place. They advanced to the quarterfinals of the American Athletic tournament where they lost to SMU.

Previous season
The Pirates finished the season 17–17, 5–11 in C-USA play to finish in a tie for 12th place. They advanced to the second round of the C-USA tournament where they lost to UTEP. They were invited to the CollegeInsider.com Tournament where they lost in the first round to Wright State.

Departures

Incoming Transfers

Incoming recruits

Recruiting Class of 2015

Roster

Schedule

|-
!colspan=9 style="background:#4F0076; color:#FFE600;"| Regular season

|-
!colspan=9 style="background:#4F0076; color:#FFE600;"| American Athletic Conference tournament

References

East Carolina Pirates men's basketball seasons
East Carolina
East Carolina Pirates men's basketball
East Carolina Pirates men's basketball